The 2011 Big Sky men's basketball tournament was played March 5–9, with the first round quarterfinal games held at the higher seed's home arena. The semifinals and final were at the Butler–Hancock Sports Pavilion in Greeley, Colorado, the home court of regular season champion Northern Colorado. 

The top six teams from regular season play qualified for the tournament, and the top two received a bye to the semifinals.  Host Northern Colorado won the title to advance to the NCAA tournament, their first appearance as a Division I program.

Bracket

2010–11 Big Sky Conference men's basketball season
2011
Big Sky Conference men's basketball tournament
Big Sky Conference men's basketball tournament
Greeley, Colorado
College sports tournaments in Colorado
Basketball competitions in Colorado